This is an incomplete list of Statutory Rules of Northern Ireland in 2002.

1-100

 Misuse of Drugs Regulations (Northern Ireland) 2002 (S.R. 2002 No. 1)
 General Dental Services (Amendment) Regulations (Northern Ireland) 2002 (S.R. 2002 No. 2)
 Optical Charges and Payments (Amendment) Regulations (Northern Ireland) 2002 (S.R. 2002 No. 5)
 Fisheries and Aquaculture Structures (Grants) Regulations (Northern Ireland) 2002 (S.R. 2002 No. 6)
 Potatoes Originating in Germany (Notification) Order (Northern Ireland) 2002 (S.R. 2002 No. 7)
 Motor Vehicles (Authorised Weight) (Amendment) Regulations (Northern Ireland) 2002 (S.R. 2002 No. 8)
 Street Works (Register, Notices, Directions and Designations) Regulations (Northern Ireland) 2002 (S.R. 2002 No. 10)
 Fisheries (Amendment) Byelaws (Northern Ireland) 2002 (S.R. 2002 No. 11)
 Magistrates' Courts (Detention and Forfeiture of Terrorist Cash) Rules (Northern Ireland) 2002 (S.R. 2002 No. 12)
 Social Fund (Maternity and Funeral Expenses) (General) (Amendment) Regulations (Northern Ireland) 2002 (S.R. 2002 No. 14)
 Rules of the Supreme Court (Northern Ireland) (Amendment) 2002 (S.R. 2002 No. 15)
 Income Support (General) (Standard Interest Rate Amendment) Regulations (Northern Ireland) 2002 (S.R. 2002 No. 16)
 Pesticides (Maximum Residue Levels in Crops, Food and Feeding Stuffs) Regulations (Northern Ireland) 2002 (S.R. 2002 No. 20)
 Plant Protection Products (Amendment) Regulations (Northern Ireland) 2002 (S.R. 2002 No. 21)
 Adoption (Intercountry Aspects) Act (Northern Ireland) 2001 (Commencement No. 2) Order (Northern Ireland) 2002 (S.R. 2002 No. 22)
 Police Emblems and Flags Regulations (Northern Ireland) 2002 (S.R. 2002 No. 23)
 Employment Rights (Increase of Limits) Order (Northern Ireland) 2002 (S.R. 2002 No. 24)
 Welfare Reform and Pensions (1999 Order) (Commencement No. 10) Order (Northern Ireland) 2002 (S.R. 2002 No. 25)
 Rates (Regional Rates) Order (Northern Ireland) 2002 (S.R. 2002 No. 26)
 Pesticides (Maximum Residue Levels in Crops, Food and Feeding Stuffs) (Amendment) Regulations (Northern Ireland) 2002 (S.R. 2002 No. 27)
 Sulphur Content of Liquid Fuels Regulations (Northern Ireland) 2002 (S.R. 2002 No. 28)
 Marketing of Quality Agricultural Products Grant Regulations (Northern Ireland) 2002 (S.R. 2002 No. 29)
 Agricultural Processing and Marketing Grant Regulations (Northern Ireland) 2002 (S.R. 2002 No. 30)
 Social Security (Attendance Allowance and Disability Living Allowance) (Amendment) Regulations (Northern Ireland) 2002 (S.R. 2002 No. 31)
 Food and Animal Feedingstuffs (Products of Animal Origin from China) (Control) Regulations (Northern Ireland) 2002 (S.R. 2002 No. 33)
 Carriage of Dangerous Goods (Amendment) Regulations (Northern Ireland) 2002 (S.R. 2002 No. 34)
 Notification of Marketing of Food for Particular Nutritional Uses Regulations (Northern Ireland) 2002 (S.R. 2002 No. 35)
 Weights and Measures (Prescribed Stamp) (Amendment) Regulations (Northern Ireland) 2002 (S.R. 2002 No. 36)
 Coroners (Practice and Procedure) (Amendment) Rules (Northern Ireland) 2002 (S.R. 2002 No. 37)
 Sweeteners in Food (Amendment) Regulations (Northern Ireland) 2002 (S.R. 2002 No. 39)
 Belfast Harbour Order (Northern Ireland) 2002 (S.R. 2002 No. 40)
 Londonderry Harbour Order (Northern Ireland) 2002 (S.R. 2002 No. 41)
 Warrenpoint Harbour Authority Order (Northern Ireland) 2002 (S.R. 2002 No. 42)
 Nurses, Midwives and Health Visitors (Professional Conduct) (Amendment) Rules 2002, Approval Order (Northern Ireland) 2002 (S.R. 2002 No. 43)
 Foot-and-Mouth Disease (Controlled Area) Order (Northern Ireland) 2002 (S.R. 2002 No. 44)
 Adoption (Intercountry Aspects) Act (Northern Ireland) 2001 (Commencement No. 3) Order (Northern Ireland) 2002 (S.R. 2002 No. 45)
 Travelling Expenses and Remission of Charges (Amendment) Regulations (Northern Ireland) 2002 (S.R. 2002 No. 46)
 Motor Vehicle Testing (Amendment) (Fees) Regulations (Northern Ireland) 2002 (S.R. 2002 No. 47)
 Goods Vehicles (Testing) (Fees) (Amendment) Regulations (Northern Ireland) 2002 (S.R. 2002 No. 48)
 Public Service Vehicles (Licence Fees) (Amendment) Regulations (Northern Ireland) 2002 (S.R. 2002 No. 49)
 Passenger and Goods Vehicles (Recording Equipment) (Fees) (Amendment) Regulations (Northern Ireland) 2002 (S.R. 2002 No. 50)
 Motor Vehicles (Driving Licences) (Amendment) (Test Fees) Regulations (Northern Ireland) 2002 (S.R. 2002 No. 51)
 Road Traffic (Health Services Charges) (Amendment) Regulations (Northern Ireland) 2002 (S.R. 2002 No. 52)
 Diseases of Fish (Control) (Amendment) Regulations (Northern Ireland) 2002 (S.R. 2002 No. 53)
 Registered Rents (Increase) Order (Northern Ireland) 2002 (S.R. 2002 No. 54)
 Domestic Energy Efficiency Grants Regulations (Northern Ireland) 2002 (S.R. 2002 No. 56)
 Social Security Pensions (Low Earnings Threshold) Order (Northern Ireland) 2002 (S.R. 2002 No. 57)
 Income Support (General) (Standard Interest Rate Amendment No. 2) Regulations (Northern Ireland) 2002 (S.R. 2002 No. 58)
 Social Security (Claims and Payments) (Amendment) Regulations (Northern Ireland) 2002 (S.R. 2002 No. 59)
 Legal Aid (Financial Conditions) Regulations (Northern Ireland) 2002 (S.R. 2002 No. 60)
 Legal Advice and Assistance (Financial Conditions) Regulations (Northern Ireland) 2002 (S.R. 2002 No. 61)
 Legal Advice and Assistance (Amendment) Regulations (Northern Ireland) 2002 (S.R. 2002 No. 62)
 Welfare Reform and Pensions (1999 Order) (Commencement No. 11) Order (Northern Ireland) 2002 (S.R. 2002 No. 63)
 Occupational Pension Schemes (Minimum Funding Requirement and Miscellaneous Amendments) Regulations (Northern Ireland) 2002 (S.R. 2002 No. 64)
 Health and Personal Social Services Act (Northern Ireland) 2001 (Fund-holding Practices) (Transfer of Assets, Rights and Liabilities and Transitional Provisions) Order (Northern Ireland) 2002 (S.R. 2002 No. 66)
 Social Security (Claims and Payments and Miscellaneous Amendments) Regulations (Northern Ireland) 2002 (S.R. 2002 No. 67)
 Child Support, Pensions and Social Security (2000 Act) (Commencement No. 7) Order (Northern Ireland) 2002 (S.R. 2002 No. 68)
 Health and Personal Social Services (Superannuation) (Amendment) Regulations (Northern Ireland) 2002 (S.R. 2002 No. 69)
 Units of Measurement Regulations (Northern Ireland) 2002 (S.R. 2002 No. 70)
 Weights and Measures (Metrication Amendments) Regulations (Northern Ireland) 2002 (S.R. 2002 No. 71)
 Less Favoured Area Compensatory Allowances Regulations (Northern Ireland) 2002 (S.R. 2002 No. 72)
 Health and Personal Social Services Act (Northern Ireland) 2001 (Commencement No. 3) Order (Northern Ireland) 2002 (S.R. 2002 No. 73)
 Occupational Pension Schemes (Winding Up Notices and Reports, etc.) Regulations (Northern Ireland) 2002 (S.R. 2002 No. 74)
 Social Security Fraud (2001 Act) (Commencement No. 2) Order (Northern Ireland) 2002 (S.R. 2002 No. 75)
 Police (Northern Ireland) Act 2000 (Policing Plan) Regulations 2002 (S.R. 2002 No. 76)
 Social Security (Loss of Benefit) Regulations (Northern Ireland) 2002 (S.R. 2002 No. 79)
 Social Security (Loss of Benefit) (Consequential Amendments) Regulations (Northern Ireland) 2002 (S.R. 2002 No. 80)
 Food (Star Anise from Third Countries) (Emergency Control) Order (Northern Ireland) 2002 (S.R. 2002 No. 82)
 Welfare Foods (Amendment) Regulations (Northern Ireland) 2002 (S.R. 2002 No. 83)
 Dental Charges (Amendment) Regulations (Northern Ireland) 2002 (S.R. 2002 No. 84)
 Optical Charges and Payments and General Ophthalmic Services (Amendment) Regulations (Northern Ireland) 2002 (S.R. 2002 No. 85)
 Social Security (Incapacity) (Miscellaneous Amendments) Regulations (Northern Ireland) 2002 (S.R. 2002 No. 86)
 Social Security (Guardian's Allowances) (Amendment) Regulations (Northern Ireland) 2002 (S.R. 2002 No. 87)
 Dairy Produce Quotas Regulations (Northern Ireland) 2002 (S.R. 2002 No. 88)
 Social Security Revaluation of Earnings Factors Order (Northern Ireland) 2002 (S.R. 2002 No. 89)
 Social Fund (Maternity and Funeral Expenses) (General) (Amendment No. 2) Regulations (Northern Ireland) 2002 (S.R. 2002 No. 90)
 Charges for Drugs and Appliances (Amendment) Regulations (Northern Ireland) 2002 (S.R. 2002 No. 91)
 Pharmaceutical Services and General Medical Services (Amendment) Regulations (Northern Ireland) 2002 (S.R. 2002 No. 92)
 Working Time (Amendment) Regulations (Northern Ireland) 2002 (S.R. 2002 No. 93)
 Air Quality Limit Values Regulations (Northern Ireland) 2002 (S.R. 2002 No. 94)
 Police Service of Northern Ireland Regulations 2002 (S.R. 2002 No. 95)
 Police Service of Northern Ireland Reserve (Full-time) (Appointment and Conditions of Service) Regulations 2002 (S.R. 2002 No. 96)
 Social Security (Disability Living Allowance) (Amendment) Regulations (Northern Ireland) 2002 (S.R. 2002 No. 97)
 Guaranteed Minimum Pensions Increase Order (Northern Ireland) 2002 (S.R. 2002 No. 98)
 Social Security Benefits Up-rating Order (Northern Ireland) 2002 (S.R. 2002 No. 99)
 Police Service of Northern Ireland Pensions Regulations 2002 (S.R. 2002 No. 100)

101-200

 Police Service of Northern Ireland Reserve (Full-time) Pensions Regulations 2002 (S.R. 2002 No. 101)
 Pensions Increase (Review) Order (Northern Ireland) 2002 (S.R. 2002 No. 102)
 Social Security (Work-focused Interviews for Lone Parents Amendment) Regulations (Northern Ireland) 2002 (S.R. 2002 No. 105)
 Social Security (Hospital In-Patients) (Amendment) Regulations (Northern Ireland) 2002 (S.R. 2002 No. 106)
 Social Security (Industrial Injuries) (Dependency) (Permitted Earnings Limits) Order (Northern Ireland) 2002 (S.R. 2002 No. 107)
 Social Security Benefits Up-rating Regulations (Northern Ireland) 2002 (S.R. 2002 No. 108)
 Occupational and Personal Pension Schemes (Contracting-out) (Miscellaneous Amendments) Regulations (Northern Ireland) 2002 (S.R. 2002 No. 109)
 Maternity and Parental Leave etc. (Amendment) Regulations (Northern Ireland) 2002 (S.R. 2002 No. 110)
 Education (Student Support) (Amendment) Regulations (Northern Ireland) 2002 (S.R. 2002 No. 111)
 Students Awards (Amendment) Regulations (Northern Ireland) 2002 (S.R. 2002 No. 112)
 Health and Personal Social Services (Assessment of Resources) (Amendment) Regulations (Northern Ireland) 2002 (S.R. 2002 No. 113)
 Workmen's Compensation (Supplementation) (Amendment) Regulations (Northern Ireland) 2002 (S.R. 2002 No. 114)
 Local Government Pension Scheme (Amendment) Regulations (Northern Ireland) 2002 (S.R. 2002 No. 115)
 Road Service Licensing (Community Licences) Regulations (Northern Ireland) 2002 (S.R. 2002 No. 116)
 Nurses, Midwives and Health Visitors (Professional Conduct) (Amendment) (No. 2) Rules 2002, Approval Order (Northern Ireland) 2002 (S.R. 2002 No. 117)
 Child Support, Pensions and Social Security (2000 Act) (Commencement No. 8) Order (Northern Ireland) 2002 (S.R. 2002 No. 118)
 Declarations of Parentage (Allocation of Proceedings) Order (Northern Ireland) 2002 (S.R. 2002 No. 119)
 Labour Relations Agency Arbitration Scheme Order (Northern Ireland) 2002 (S.R. 2002 No. 120)
 Child Support (Great Britain Reciprocal Arrangements) (Amendment) Regulations (Northern Ireland) 2002 (S.R. 2002 No. 121)
 Plant Protection Products (Amendment) (No. 2) Regulations (Northern Ireland) 2002 (S.R. 2002 No. 125)
 Welfare Reform and Pensions (1999 Order) (Commencement No. 12) Order (Northern Ireland) 2002 (S.R. 2002 No. 126)
 Occupational and Personal Pension Schemes (Bankruptcy) Regulations (Northern Ireland) 2002 (S.R. 2002 No. 127)
 Social Security (Miscellaneous Amendments) Regulations (Northern Ireland) 2002 (S.R. 2002 No. 128)
 Health and Personal Social Services (Superannuation) (Additional Voluntary Contributions) (Amendment) Regulations (Northern Ireland) 2002 (S.R. 2002 No. 129)
 Game Preservation (Amendment) (2002 Act)[ (Commencement) Order (Northern Ireland) 2002 (S.R. 2002 No. 130)
 Personal Social Services (Preserved Rights) (2002 Act) (Commencement) Order (Northern Ireland) 2002 (S.R. 2002 No. 131)
 Social Security (Amendment) (Residential Care and Nursing Homes) Regulations (Northern Ireland) 2002 (S.R. 2002 No. 132)
 Pneumoconiosis, etc., (Workers' Compensation) (Payment of Claims) (Amendment) Regulations (Northern Ireland) 2002 (S.R. 2002 No. 133)
 Industrial Development (2002 Act) (Commencement) Order (Northern Ireland) 2002 (S.R. 2002 No. 134)
 Maternity and Parental Leave etc. (Amendment No. 2) Regulations (Northern Ireland) 2002 (S.R. 2002 No. 135)
 Personal Social Services (Preserved Rights) Regulations (Northern Ireland) 2002 (S.R. 2002 No. 136)
 Family Proceedings (Amendment) Rules (Northern Ireland) 2002 (S.R. 2002 No. 137)
 Family Law (2001 Act) (Commencement) Order (Northern Ireland) 2002 (S.R. 2002 No. 138)
 Food (Figs, Hazelnuts and Pistachios from Turkey) (Emergency Control) Regulations (Northern Ireland) 2002 (S.R. 2002 No. 140)
 Food (Jelly Confectionery) (Emergency Control) Regulations (Northern Ireland) 2002 (S.R. 2002 No. 141)
 Traffic Signs (Amendment) Regulations (Northern Ireland) 2002 (S.R. 2002 No. 143)
 Adoption of Children from Overseas Regulations (Northern Ireland) 2002 (S.R. 2002 No. 144)
 Police (Northern Ireland) Act 2000 (Commencement No. 4) Order 2002 (S.R. 2002 No. 146)
 Explosives (Fireworks) Regulations (Northern Ireland) 2002 (S.R. 2002 No. 147)
 Criminal Injuries Compensation (Northern Ireland) Order 2002 (Commencement No. 1) Order 2002 (S.R. 2002 No. 148)
 Blood Tests (Evidence of Paternity) (Amendment) Regulations (Northern Ireland) 2002 (S.R. 2002 No. 150)
 Milk Marketing Board (Residuary Functions) (Amendment) Regulations (Northern Ireland) 2002 (S.R. 2002 No. 151)
 Motor Vehicles (Third-Party Risks) (Amendment) Regulations (Northern Ireland) 2002 (S.R. 2002 No. 154)
 Magistrates' Courts (Declarations of Parentage) Rules (Northern Ireland) 2002 (S.R. 2002 No. 158)
 Magistrates' Courts (Civil Jurisdiction and Judgments Act 1982) (Amendment) Rules (Northern Ireland) 2002 (S.R. 2002 No. 159)
 Medicated Feedingstuffs (Amendment) Regulations (Northern Ireland) 2002 (S.R. 2002 No. 161)
 Feedingstuffs (Zootechnical Products) (Amendment) Regulations (Northern Ireland) 2002 (S.R. 2002 No. 162)
 Magistrates' Courts (Blood Tests) (Amendment) Rules (Northern Ireland) 2002 (S.R. 2002 No. 163)
 Social Security and Child Support (Miscellaneous Amendments) Regulations (Northern Ireland) 2002 (S.R. 2002 No. 164)
 Social Security Fraud (2001 Act) (Commencement No. 3) Order (Northern Ireland) 2002 (S.R. 2002 No. 165)
 Dundrod Circuit (Admission Charges) Regulations (Northern Ireland) 2002 (S.R. 2002 No. 167)
 Seed Potatoes (Crop Fees) Regulations (Northern Ireland) 2002 (S.R. 2002 No. 169)
 General Dental Services (Amendment No. 2) Regulations (Northern Ireland) 2002 (S.R. 2002 No. 171)
 Travelling Expenses and Remission of Charges (Amendment No. 2) Regulations (Northern Ireland) 2002 (S.R. 2002 No. 172)
 Police (Northern Ireland) Act 2000 (Designated Places of Detention) Order 2002 (S.R. 2002 No. 179)
 Health and Personal Social Services (2001 Act) (Commencement No. 4) Order (Northern Ireland) 2002 (S.R. 2002 No. 180)
 Health and Personal Social Services (Penalty Charge) Regulations (Northern Ireland) 2002 (S.R. 2002 No. 181)
 Local Government (General Grant) Order (Northern Ireland) 2002 (S.R. 2002 No. 182)
 Regulation of Investigatory Powers Act 2000 (Amendment) Order (Northern Ireland) 2002 (S.R. 2002 No. 183)
 Waste and Contaminated Land (1997 Order) (Commencement No. 6) Order (Northern Ireland) 2002 (S.R. 2002 No. 185)
 Social Security and Child Support (Decisions and Appeals) (Miscellaneous Amendments) Regulations (Northern Ireland) 2002 (S.R. 2002 No. 189)
 Planning (General Development) (Amendment) Order (Northern Ireland) 2002 (S.R. 2002 No. 195)
 Motor Vehicles (Construction and Use) (Amendment) Regulations (Northern Ireland) 2002 (S.R. 2002 No. 197)

201-300

 Rules of the Supreme Court (Northern Ireland) (Amendment No. 2) 2002 (S.R. 2002 No. 202)
 Income Support (General) and Jobseeker's Allowance (Amendment) Regulations (Northern Ireland) 2002 (S.R. 2002 No. 203)
 Northern Ireland Criminal Injuries Compensation Scheme 2002 (Commencement No. 1) Order 2002 (S.R. 2002 No. 204)
 Criminal Injuries Compensation (Northern Ireland) Order 2002 (Commencement No. 2) Order 2002 (S.R. 2002 No. 205)
 Pharmaceutical Society of Northern Ireland (General) (Amendment) Regulations (Northern Ireland) 2002 (S.R. 2002 No. 206)
 Animal By-Products Order (Northern Ireland) 2002 (S.R. 2002 No. 209)
 Animal By-Products (Revocation) Regulations (Northern Ireland) 2002 (S.R. 2002 No. 210)
 Superannuation (Invest Northern Ireland) Order (Northern Ireland) 2002 (S.R. 2002 No. 211)
 Legal Advice and Assistance (Amendment No. 2) Regulations (Northern Ireland) 2002 (S.R. 2002 No. 212)
 General Medical Services (Amendment) Regulations (Northern Ireland) 2002 (S.R. 2002 No. 213)
 Employment Relations (1999 Order) (Commencement No. 5 and Transitional Provision) Order (Northern Ireland) 2002 (S.R. 2002 No. 214)
 Stakeholder Pension Schemes (Amendment) Regulations (Northern Ireland) 2002 (S.R. 2002 No. 216)
 Meat (Hazard Analysis and Critical Control Point) Regulations (Northern Ireland) 2002 (S.R. 2002 No. 217)
 Contaminants in Food Regulations (Northern Ireland) 2002 (S.R. 2002 No. 219)
 Optical Charges and Payments (Amendment No. 2) Regulations (Northern Ireland) 2002 (S.R. 2002 No. 221)
 Social Security (Students and Income-Related Benefits Amendment) Regulations (Northern Ireland) 2002 (S.R. 2002 No. 222)
 Insolvency (Northern Ireland) Order 1989 (Amendment) Regulations (Northern Ireland) 2002 (S.R. 2002 No. 223)
 Education (Student Support) Regulations (Northern Ireland) 2002 (S.R. 2002 No. 224)
 Transmissible Spongiform Encephalopathy Regulations (Northern Ireland) 2002 (S.R. 2002 No. 225)
 Food and Animal Feedingstuffs (Products of Animal Origin from China) (Emergency Control) Regulations (Northern Ireland) 2002 (S.R. 2002 No. 226)
 Ground Rents (Multiplier) Order (Northern Ireland) 2002 (S.R. 2002 No. 228)
 Land Registration (Amendment) Rules (Northern Ireland) 2002 (S.R. 2002 No. 229)
 Allowances to Members of the Assembly (Winding up Allowance) (Amendment) Order (Northern Ireland) 2002 (S.R. 2002 No. 230)
 Change of District Name (Lisburn Borough) Order (Northern Ireland) 2002 (S.R. 2002 No. 231)
 Jobseeker's Allowance (Joint Claims) (Amendment) Regulations (Northern Ireland) 2002 (S.R. 2002 No. 236)
 Social Security (Industrial Injuries) (Prescribed Diseases) (Amendment) Regulations (Northern Ireland) 2002 (S.R. 2002 No. 237)
 Animal By-Products (Identification) (Amendment) Regulations (Northern Ireland) 2002 (S.R. 2002 No. 238)
 Producer Responsibility Obligations (Packaging Waste) (Amendment) Regulations (Northern Ireland) 2002 (S.R. 2002 No. 239)
 County Court (Blood Tests) (Amendment) Rules (Northern Ireland) 2002 (S.R. 2002 No. 240)
 Education (Student Loans) (Amendment) Regulations (Northern Ireland) 2002 (S.R. 2002 No. 241)
 Births, Deaths and Marriages (Fees) (No. 2) Order (Northern Ireland) 2002 (S.R. 2002 No. 242)
 Social Security (Intercalating Students Amendment) Regulations (Northern Ireland) 2002 (S.R. 2002 No. 243)
 Fair Employment (Monitoring) (Amendment) Regulations (Northern Ireland) 2002 (S.R. 2002 No. 244)
 Industrial Training Levy (Construction Industry) Order (Northern Ireland) 2002 (S.R. 2002 No. 245)
 Potatoes Originating in Egypt (Amendment) Regulations (Northern Ireland) 2002 (S.R. 2002 No. 246)
 Child Support (Temporary Compensation Payment Scheme) (Modification and Amendment) Regulations (Northern Ireland) 2002 (S.R. 2002 No. 247)
 Controlled Waste Regulations (Northern Ireland) 2002 (S.R. 2002 No. 248)
 Environmental Impact Assessment (Forestry) (Amendment) Regulations (Northern Ireland) 2002 (S.R. 2002 No. 249)
 Pesticides (Maximum Residue Levels in Crops, Food and Feeding Stuffs) (Amendment) (No. 2) Regulations (Northern Ireland) 2002 (S.R. 2002 No. 250)
 Ground Rents (2001 Act) (Commencement No. 1) Order (Northern Ireland) 2002 (S.R. 2002 No. 251)
 Property (1997 Order) (Commencement No. 3) Order (Northern Ireland) 2002 (S.R. 2002 No. 252)
 Trustee (2001 Act) (Commencement) Order (Northern Ireland) 2002 (S.R. 2002 No. 253)
 Social Security (Claims and Payments) (Amendment No. 2) Regulations (Northern Ireland) 2002 (S.R. 2002 No. 254)
 County Court (Amendment) Rules (Northern Ireland) 2002 (S.R. 2002 No. 255)
 Motor Vehicles (Construction and Use) (Amendment No. 2) Regulations (Northern Ireland) 2002 (S.R. 2002 No. 256)
 Seeds (Fees) Regulations (Northern Ireland) 2002 (S.R. 2002 No. 257)
 Police Service of Northern Ireland (Recruitment of Police Support Staff) Regulations 2002 (S.R. 2002 No. 258)
 Welfare of Farmed Animals (Amendment) Regulations (Northern Ireland) 2002 (S.R. 2002 No. 259)
 Royal Ulster Constabulary GC Foundation Regulations 2002 (S.R. 2002 No. 260)
 Insolvency (Amendment) Rules (Northern Ireland) 2002 (S.R. 2002 No. 261)
 Contaminants in Food (Amendment) Regulations (Northern Ireland) 2002 (S.R. 2002 No. 262)
 Feeding Stuffs (Amendment) Regulations (Northern Ireland) 2002 (S.R. 2002 No. 263)
 Food for Particular Nutritional Uses (Addition of Substances for Specific Nutritional Purposes) Regulations (Northern Ireland) 2002 (S.R. 2002 No. 264)
 Students Awards Regulations (Northern Ireland) 2002 (S.R. 2002 No. 265)
 General Medical Services (Amendment No. 2) Regulations (Northern Ireland) 2002 (S.R. 2002 No. 266)
 Social Security (Personal Allowances for Children and Young Persons Amendment) Regulations (Northern Ireland) 2002 (S.R. 2002 No. 267)
 Stakeholder Pension Schemes (Amendment No. 2) Regulations (Northern Ireland) 2002 (S.R. 2002 No. 268)
 Plant Health (Phytophthora ramorum) Order (Northern Ireland) 2002 (S.R. 2002 No. 269)
 Social Security (Students and Income-Related Benefits Amendment No. 2) Regulations (Northern Ireland) 2002 (S.R. 2002 No. 270)
 Controlled Waste (Duty of Care) Regulations (Northern Ireland) 2002 (S.R. 2002 No. 271)
 Education (Grants for Disabled Postgraduate Students) (Amendment) Regulations (Northern Ireland) 2002 (S.R. 2002 No. 272)
 Plant Health (Amendment) Order (Northern Ireland) 2002 (S.R. 2002 No. 273)
 Fisheries (Amendment No. 2) Byelaws (Northern Ireland) 2002 (S.R. 2002 No. 274)
 Social Security (Employment Programme Amendment) Regulations (Northern Ireland) 2002 (S.R. 2002 No. 275)
 Social Security (Incapacity) (Miscellaneous Amendments No. 2) Regulations (Northern Ireland) 2002 (S.R. 2002 No. 276)
 Bovines and Bovine Products (Trade) (Amendment) Regulations (Northern Ireland) 2002 (S.R. 2002 No. 278)
 Occupational Pension Schemes (Member-nominated Trustees and Directors) (Amendment) Regulations (Northern Ireland) 2002 (S.R. 2002 No. 279)
 Housing Benefit (General) (Amendment) Regulations (Northern Ireland) 2002 (S.R. 2002 No. 280)
 Fire Services (Appointments and Promotion) (Amendment) Regulations (Northern Ireland) 2002 (S.R. 2002 No. 283)
 Social Fund (Miscellaneous Amendments) Regulations (Northern Ireland) 2002 (S.R. 2002 No. 284)
 Plant Health (Wood and Bark) (Amendment) Order (Northern Ireland) 2002 (S.R. 2002 No. 285)
 Part-time Workers (Prevention of Less Favourable Treatment) (Amendment) Regulations (Northern Ireland) 2002 (S.R. 2002 No. 286)
 Plant Protection Products (Amendment) (No. 3) Regulations (Northern Ireland) 2002 (S.R. 2002 No. 289)
 Gas Order 1996 (Amendment) Regulations (Northern Ireland) 2002 (S.R. 2002 No. 291)
 Regulation of Investigatory Powers (Prescription of Offices, Ranks and Positions) Order (Northern Ireland) 2002 (S.R. 2002 No. 292)
 Food (Peanuts from China) (Emergency Control) Regulations (Northern Ireland) 2002 (S.R. 2002 No. 293)
 Motor Vehicles (Construction and Use) (Amendment No. 3) Regulations (Northern Ireland) 2002 (S.R. 2002 No. 294)
 Social Security (Miscellaneous Amendments No. 2) Regulations (Northern Ireland) 2002 (S.R. 2002 No. 295)
 Animals and Animal Products (Import and Export) (Amendment) Regulations (Northern Ireland) 2002 (S.R. 2002 No. 296)
 Social Security (Claims and Payments) (Amendment No. 3) Regulations (Northern Ireland) 2002 (S.R. 2002 No. 297)
 Fixed-term Employees (Prevention of Less Favourable Treatment) Regulations (Northern Ireland) 2002 (S.R. 2002 No. 298)
 Social Security (Personal Injury Payments Amendment) Regulations (Northern Ireland) 2002 (S.R. 2002 No. 299)
 Batteries and Accumulators (Containing Dangerous Substances) (Amendment) Regulations (Northern Ireland) 2002 (S.R. 2002 No. 300)

301-400

 Chemicals (Hazard Information and Packaging for Supply) Regulations (Northern Ireland) 2002 (S.R. 2002 No. 301)
 Biocidal Products (Amendment) Regulations (Northern Ireland) 2002 (S.R. 2002 No. 302)
 Control of Noise (Codes of Practice for Construction and Open Sites) Order (Northern Ireland) 2002 (S.R. 2002 No. 303)
 Welfare of Animals (Slaughter or Killing) (Amendment) Regulations (Northern Ireland) 2002 (S.R. 2002 No. 304)
 Food (Figs, Hazelnuts and Pistachios from Turkey) (Emergency Control No. 2) Regulations (Northern Ireland) 2002 (S.R. 2002 No. 307)
 Weights and Measures (Passing as Fit for Use for Trade and Adjustment Fees) Regulations (Northern Ireland) 2002 (S.R. 2002 No. 308)
 Measuring Instruments (EEC Requirements) (Verification Fees) Regulations (Northern Ireland) 2002 (S.R. 2002 No. 309)
 Route U134 Balloo Road, Bangor (Abandonment) Order (Northern Ireland) 2002 (S.R. 2002 No. 310)
 Health and Personal Social Services (2002 Act) (Commencement) Order (Northern Ireland) 2002 (S.R. 2002 No. 311)
 Isaac’s Court/Charles Street South. Belfast (Abandonment) Order (Northern Ireland) 2002 (S.R. 2002 No. 312)
 Old Road, Lisburn (Abandonment and Stopping-Up) Order (Northern Ireland) 2002 (S.R. 2002 No. 313)
 Hibernia Street, Holwood (Footway) (Abandonment) ( Ireland) 2002 (S.R. 2002 No. 314)
 Social Fund (Cold Weather Payments) (General) (Amendment) Regulations (Northern Ireland) 2002 (S.R. 2002 No. 315)
 Plastic Materials and Articles in Contact with Food (Amendment) Regulations (Northern Ireland) 2002 (S.R. 2002 No. 316)
 Employment Relations (1999 Order) (Commencement No. 6 and Transitional Provisions) Order (Northern Ireland) 2002 (S.R. 2002 No. 317)
 Cloghanramer Road, Newry (Abandonment) Order (Northern Ireland) 2002 (S.R. 2002 No. 318)
 Justice (Northern Ireland) Act 2002 (Commencement No. 1) Order 2002 (S.R. 2002 No. 319)
 Salaries (Assembly Ombudsman and Commissioner for Complaints) Order (Northern Ireland) 2002 (S.R. 2002 No. 320)
 Deregulation (Carer's Allowance) Order (Northern Ireland) 2002 (S.R. 2002 No. 321)
 Social Security (Carer Premium Amendment) Regulations (Northern Ireland) 2002 (S.R. 2002 No. 322)
 Social Security (Carer's Allowance) (Amendment) Regulations (Northern Ireland) 2002 (S.R. 2002 No. 323)
 Carnegie Street, etc., Lurgan (Stopping-Up) Order (Northern Ireland) 2002 (S.R. 2002 No. 324)
 Route U1361 Lakeview Road, Craigavon (Abandonment) Order (Northern Ireland) 2002 (S.R. 2002 No. 325)
 Route U345 Tullybryan Road, Ballygawley (Abandonment) Order (Northern Ireland) 2002 (S.R. 2002 No. 326)
 Social Security (Claims and Payments and Miscellaneous Amendments No. 2) Regulations (Northern Ireland) 2002 (S.R. 2002 No. 327)
 Motor Vehicles (Exchangeable Licences) (Amendment) Order (Northern Ireland) 2002 (S.R. 2002 No. 328)
 T1 Belfast-Bangor Trunk Road (Extension) Order (Northern Ireland) 2002 (S.R. 2002 No. 329)
 Trunk Roads T3 and T10 (Omagh Distributor Stage III) Order (Northern Ireland) 2002 (S.R. 2002 No. 330)
 Water Supply (Water Quality) Regulations (Northern Ireland) 2002 (S.R. 2002 No. 331)
 Income Support (General) and Jobseeker's Allowance (Amendment No. 2) Regulations (Northern Ireland) 2002 (S.R. 2002 No. 332)
 Parking Places on Roads (Disabled Persons’ Vehicles) (Amendment No. 2) Order (Northern Ireland) 2002 (S.R. 2002 No. 333)
 Insolvency (Northern Ireland) Order 1989 (Amendment No. 2) Regulations (Northern Ireland) 2002 (S.R. 2002 No. 334)
 Beef Special Premium (Amendment) Regulations (Northern Ireland) 2002 (S.R. 2002 No. 335)
 Route B72 Derry Road, Strabane (Abandonment and Stopping-Up) Order (Northern Ireland) 2002 (S.R. 2002 No. 336)
 Cycle Tracks (Ballynure) Order (Northern Ireland) 2002 (S.R. 2002 No. 337)
 Cycle Lane (Sydenham By-Pass, Belfast) Order (Northern Ireland) 2002 (S.R. 2002 No. 338)
 Food Protection (Emergency Prohibitions) Order (Northern Ireland) 2002 (S.R. 2002 No. 339)
 Products of Animal Origin (Third Country Imports) Regulations (Northern Ireland) 2002 (S.R. 2002 No. 340)
 Supreme Court Fees (Amendment) Order (Northern Ireland) 2002 (S.R. 2002 No. 341)
 County Court Fees (Amendment) Order (Northern Ireland) 2002 (S.R. 2002 No. 342)
 Magistrates' Courts Fees (Amendment) Order (Northern Ireland) 2002 (S.R. 2002 No. 343)
 Family Proceedings Fees (Amendment) Order (Northern Ireland) 2002 (S.R. 2002 No. 344)
 Code of Practice (Industrial Action Ballots and Notice to Employers) (Appointed Day) Order (Northern Ireland) 2002 (S.R. 2002 No. 345)
 Code of Practice (Redundancy Consultation and Procedures) (Appointed Day) Order (Northern Ireland) 2002 (S.R. 2002 No. 346)
 Code of Practice (Disciplinary and Grievance Procedures) (Appointed Day) Order (Northern Ireland) 2002 (S.R. 2002 No. 347)
 Route A34 Lisnaskea Road, Maguiresbridge (Abandonment) Order (Northern Ireland) 2002 (S.R. 2002 No. 348)
 Northern Ireland Social Care Council (Appointments and Procedure) (Amendment) Regulations (Northern Ireland) 2002 (S.R. 2002 No. 349)
 Children (Allocation of Proceedings) (Amendment) Order (Northern Ireland) 2002 (S.R. 2002 No. 350)
 Social Security (2002 Act) (Commencement No. 1) Order (Northern Ireland) 2002 (S.R. 2002 No. 351)
 Local Government Pension Scheme Regulations (Northern Ireland) 2002 (S.R. 2002 No. 352)
 Local Government Pension Scheme (Amendment No. 2 and Transitional Provisions) Regulations (Northern Ireland) 2002 (S.R. 2002 No. 353)
 Social Security, Statutory Maternity Pay and Statutory Sick Pay (Miscellaneous Amendments) Regulations (Northern Ireland) 2002 (S.R. 2002 No. 354)
 Maternity and Parental Leave etc. (Amendment No. 3) Regulations (Northern Ireland) 2002 (S.R. 2002 No. 355)
 Employment (2002 Order) (Commencement and Transitional and Saving Provisions) Order (Northern Ireland) 2002 (S.R. 2002 No. 356)
 Air Quality Limit Values (Amendment) Regulations (Northern Ireland) 2002 (S.R. 2002 No. 357)
 Social Security (2002 Act) (Commencement No. 2 and Transitional and Saving Provisions) Order (Northern Ireland) 2002 (S.R. 2002 No. 358)
 Social Security, Statutory Maternity Pay and Statutory Sick Pay (Miscellaneous Amendments No. 2) Regulations (Northern Ireland) 2002 (S.R. 2002 No. 359)
 Cycle Tracks (Bangor) Order (Northern Ireland) 2002 (S.R. 2002 No. 360)
 Traffic Weight Restriction (Ballybarnes Road, Newtownards) Order (Northern Ireland) 2002 (S.R. 2002 No. 361)
 Loading Bays on Roads (Amendment No. 2) Order (Northern Ireland) 2002 (S.R. 2002 No. 362)
 Social Security (Paternity and Adoption Amendment) Regulations (Northern Ireland) 2002 (S.R. 2002 No. 363)
 Electricity (Applications for Consent) (Fees) (Amendment) Regulations (Northern Ireland) 2002 (S.R. 2002 No. 364)
 Moore’s Lane, Lurgan (Stopping-Up) Order (Northern Ireland) 2002 (S.R. 2002 No. 365)
 State Pension Credit (2002 Act) (Commencement No. 1) Order (Northern Ireland) 2002 (S.R. 2002 No. 366)
 Fair Employment (Specification of Public Authorities) (Amendment) Order (Northern Ireland) 2002 (S.R. 2002 No. 367)
 Sheep Annual Premium (Amendment) Regulations (Northern Ireland) 2002 (S.R. 2002 No. 368)
 Occupational Pensions (Revaluation) Order (Northern Ireland) 2002 (S.R. 2002 No. 369)
 Food Protection (Emergency Prohibitions) (Revocation) Order (Northern Ireland) 2002 (S.R. 2002 No. 370)
 Fisheries (Amendment No. 3) Byelaws (Northern Ireland) 2002 (S.R. 2002 No. 371)
 Fisheries (Tagging and Logbook) (Amendment) Byelaws (Northern Ireland) 2002 (S.R. 2002 No. 372)
 Road Traffic (Health Services Charges) (Amendment No. 2) Regulations (Northern Ireland) 2002 (S.R. 2002 No. 373)
 Driving Licences (Community Driving Licence) Regulations (Northern Ireland) 2002 (S.R. 2002 No. 374)
 Motor Vehicles (Construction and Use) (Amendment No. 4) Regulations (Northern Ireland) 2002 (S.R. 2002 No. 375)
 Legal Aid in Criminal Proceedings (Costs) (Amendment) Rules (Northern Ireland) 2002 (S.R. 2002 No. 376)
 Paternity and Adoption Leave Regulations (Northern Ireland) 2002 (S.R. 2002 No. 377)
 Statutory Paternity Pay and Statutory Adoption Pay (General) Regulations (Northern Ireland) 2002 (S.R. 2002 No. 378)
 Statutory Paternity Pay and Statutory Adoption Pay (Administration) Regulations (Northern Ireland) 2002 (S.R. 2002 No. 379)
 Statutory Paternity Pay and Statutory Adoption Pay (Weekly Rates) Regulations (Northern Ireland) 2002 (S.R. 2002 No. 380)
 Statutory Paternity Pay and Statutory Adoption Pay (Health and Personal Social Services Employees) Regulations (Northern Ireland) 2002 (S.R. 2002 No. 381)
 Statutory Paternity Pay and Statutory Adoption Pay (Persons Abroad and Mariners) Regulations (Northern Ireland) 2002 (S.R. 2002 No. 382)
 Motor Vehicles (Driving Licences) (Amendment No. 2) Regulations (Northern Ireland) 2002 (S.R. 2002 No. 383)
 Public Service Vehicles (Conditions of Fitness, Equipment and Use) (Amendment) Regulations (Northern Ireland) 2002 (S.R. 2002 No. 384)
 Police (Recruitment) (Northern Ireland) (Amendment) Regulations 2002 (S.R. 2002 No. S.R. 2002 No. 385)
 Northern Ireland Practice and Education Council for Nursing and Midwifery (Appointments and Procedure) Regulations (Northern Ireland) 2002 (S.R. 2002 No. 386)
 Ballee Road East, Ballymena (Abandonment) Order (Northern Ireland) 2002 (S.R. 2002 No. 387)
 Jobseeker's Allowance (Amendment) Regulations (Northern Ireland) 2002 (S.R. 2002 No. 388)
 One-Way Traffic (Lisburn) (Amendment) Order (Northern Ireland) 2002 (S.R. 2002 No. 389)
 Cycle Tracks (Armagh) Order (Northern Ireland) 2002 (S.R. 2002 No. 390)
 Child Support Appeals (Jurisdiction of Courts) Order (Northern Ireland) 2002 (S.R. 2002 No. 391)
 Social Security Fraud (2001 Act) (Commencement No. 4) Order (Northern Ireland) 2002 (S.R. 2002 No. 392)
 Teachers' (Compensation for Redundancy and Premature Retirement) (Amendment) Regulations (Northern Ireland) 2002 (S.R. 2002 No. 393)
 Londonderry Port and Harbour (Variation of Pilotage Limits) Order (Northern Ireland) 2002 (S.R. 2002 No. 394)
 River Bann Navigation Order (Northern Ireland) 2002 (S.R. 2002 No. 395)
 Airports Byelaws (Designation) Order (Northern Ireland) 2002 (S.R. 2002 No. 396)
 Pharmaceutical Services and Charges for Drugs and Appliances (Amendment) Regulations (Northern Ireland) 2002 (S.R. 2002 No. 397)
 On-Street Parking (Amendment No. 3) Order (Northern Ireland) 2002 (S.R. 2002 No. 398)
 Off-Street Parking (Amendment No. 2) Order (Northern Ireland) 2002 (S.R. 2002 No. 399)
 Compulsory Registration of Title Order (Northern Ireland) 2002 (S.R. 2002 No. 400)

401-500

 Compulsory Registration of Title (No. 2) Order (Northern Ireland) 2002 (S.R. 2002 No. 401)
 Route B80 Tempo Road, Ratoran (Abandonment) Order (Northern Ireland) 2002 (S.R. 2002 No. 402)
 Tax Credits (Appeals) Regulations (Northern Ireland) 2002 (S.R. 2002 No. 403)
 Forest Reproductive Material Regulations (Northern Ireland) 2002 (S.R. 2002 No. 404)
 Justice (Northern Ireland) Act 2002 (Commencement No. 2) Order 2002 (S.R. 2002 No. 405)
 Social Security Fraud (2001 Act) (Commencement No. 5) Order (Northern Ireland) 2002 (S.R. 2002 No. 406)
 Seeds (Fees) (No. 2) Regulations (Northern Ireland) 2002 (S.R. 2002 No. 407)
 Social Security Administration (Northern Ireland) Act 1992 (Amendment) Order (Northern Ireland) 2002 (S.R. 2002 No. 408)
 Rates (Making and Levying of Different Rates) Regulations (Northern Ireland) 2002 (S.R. 2002 No. 409)
 Occupational and Personal Pension Schemes (Disclosure of Information) (Amendment) Regulations (Northern Ireland) 2002 (S.R. 2002 No. 410)
 County Court (Amendment No. 2) Rules (Northern Ireland) 2002 (S.R. 2002 No. 412)
 Justice (Northern Ireland) Act 2002 (Amendment of section 46 (1)) Order 2002 (S.R. 2002 No. 414)

External links
  Statutory Rules (NI) List
 Draft Statutory Rules (NI) List

2002
2002 in Northern Ireland
Northern Ireland Statutory Rules